Fernando Avendaño or Fernando de Avendaño ( 1600 – 1665), born and died in Lima, Peru, was a Catholic priest.

He died shortly after being appointed Bishop of Santiago, Chile. He was an investigator into survivals of the primitive rites and customs of the Peruvian Indians and left valuable notes on the subject, fragments of them being preserved in the work of Pablo José Arriaga. Of great importance to linguistics are his Sermones de los misterios de nuestra santa Fe católica, published in 1649 by the order of the Archbishop of Lima, Petro Villagomez. These sermons were delivered in Quechua, and are published with their translation into Spanish.

Sources

1665 deaths
Roman Catholic missionaries in Peru
Roman Catholic missionaries in Chile
Spanish Roman Catholic missionaries
Year of birth uncertain